Johann Erdmann Hummel (11 September 1769, Kassel — 26 October 1852, Berlin) was a German painter.

Life 

Hummel studied at the Kunsthochschule Kassel from 1780 to 1792. From 1792 to 1799 he lived in Rome, where he befriended various other German landscape painters who opposed the dominant classical style typified by the work of Anton Raphael Mengs. In his works from this period he primarily devoted himself to mythological themes. In 1799 he briefly returned to Kassel, and from there moved to Berlin, where he would remain for the rest of his life with the exception of a few short trips. He worked there as an illustrator, completing a series of engravings for a biography of Martin Luther and painting occasional portraits. In 1809 he became a professor at the Prussian Academy of Arts, teaching courses on perspective, optics, and architecture.

His work is characterized by a craftsman-like attention to detail and a scientific, emphasis on exact linear perspective.

Gallery

Citations

References 
 
 Georg Hummel: Der Maler Johann Erdmann Hummel. Leben und Werk. Leipzig 1954.

External links 
 
 Entry for Johann Erdmann Hummel on the Union List of Artist Names
 Porträt: Johann Erdmann Hummel
 

1769 births
1852 deaths
18th-century German painters
18th-century German male artists
German male painters
19th-century German painters
19th-century German male artists
Artists from Kassel